Alsophila khasyana, synonym Cyathea khasyana, is a species of tree fern. Its natural distribution extends from India to Myanmar, although it is absent from Sri Lanka. A. khasyana grows in forest at an altitude of 1400–1700 m. The trunk of this plant is erect and 5–7 m tall. Fronds may be bi- or tripinnate and 2–3 m in length. A. khasyana has a long, dark stipe that is covered in numerous scales. These scales are dark and have broad, pale, fringed edges. Sori are borne near the midvein of fertile pinnules and lack indusia.

The specific epithet khasyana refers to the Khasi Hills of India.

References

khasyana
Ferns of India
Flora of Myanmar